The 2002 Boston College Eagles football team represented Boston College during the 2002 NCAA Division I-A football season. Boston College was a member of the Big East Conference. The Eagles played their home games at Alumni Stadium in Chestnut Hill, Massachusetts, which has been their home stadium since 1957.

Schedule

Roster

Team players in the NFL

References

Boston College
Boston College Eagles football seasons
Little Caesars Pizza Bowl champion seasons
Boston College Eagles football
Boston College Eagles football